Bob Bryan and Mike Bryan were the defending champions, but lost in the semifinals this year.

Arnaud Clément and Michaël Llodra won in the final 7–6(4), 6–2, against Fabrice Santoro and Nenad Zimonjić.

Seeds

Draw

Draw

External links
Draw

2006 BNP Paribas Masters
2006 ATP Tour